Fidelity Communications is a telecommunications company in Missouri, United States which provides residential and business internet, television and phone services.

History
In 2017 Fidelity Communications hired DM Web Dev Group to run an astroturfing campaign to discredit the city-run fiber broadband service in West Plains, Missouri through the website stopcityfundedinternet.com.

In January 2018, YouTube user Isaac Protiva uploaded a video revealing that Fidelity Communications was behind an initiative called "Stop City-Funded Internet," based on the fact that some images on the Stop City-Funded Internet website had "Fidelity" in their file names. The campaign appeared to be in response to the city of West Plains expanding their broadband network, and advocated for the end of municipal broadband on the basis that it was too risky. Days later, Fidelity released a letter admitting to sponsoring the campaign.

References

External links 
 Official website
 stopcityfundedinternet.com, an astroturf website paid for by Fidelity Communications 
Telecommunications companies of the United States